Dai Xi (1801 – 1860) was a Chinese painter of the 19th century and representative of the academic manner. His sobriquet was Chunshi (醇士) or “Pure-Minded Scholar” and his pen name was Yu'an (榆庵） or “Elm Retreat”, among others.

Biography
Dai Xi was a native of Qiantang (钱塘）near the cultural center of Hangzhou, although Dai spent many years in Guangzhou. In 1832 he joined officialdom, becoming a member of the Hanlin Academy.  He later became Vice Minister of the Ministry of War, although absenting himself later for illness.

During the Taiping Rebellion Hangzhou was occupied by the rebels in 1860. Dai joined in the defense of the city and later committed suicide there by drowning himself in a pond. Dai was subsequently given the posthumous title Wenjie or "Cultured and Moderate". Dai Xi painted in the manner of the great academic master Wang Hui of the previous century, although Dai Xi was said to have exceeded the master in artistic elegance. His work is similar to that of his contemporary Tang Yifen and together they were referred to as "Tang-Dai". Dai's works are usually landscapes. His works include a generous mixture of genre subjects such as plants and humans.

In 1920 and in 1934 published collections of his paintings appeared in China. Dai was also an avid coin collector, publishing a three volume (卷) work on the subject "Guchuan zonghua" (古泉丛话).

Notes

References
 
 Vainker, Shelagh, Chinese Paintings in the Ashmolean Museum Oxford, Ashmolean Museum, Oxford, 2000, p. 37.
 China On site.
 Ci hai bian ji wei yuan hui (辞海编辑委员会）. Ci hai （辞海）. Shanghai: Shanghai ci shu chu ban she （上海辞书出版社), 1979.
 Sickman, Lawrence, Eight dynasties of Chinese Paintings, Cleveland Museum of Arts, 1980.

External link

1801 births
1860 deaths
Artists from Hangzhou
Qing dynasty painters
Painters from Zhejiang
19th-century Chinese painters
Suicides by drowning in China